The Pacific Division, formerly the Central Division, was a division in the Arena Football League. The division was part of both the American and National Conferences at different points in its history. The division was first formed in  when expansion teams were formed and put into the current divisions.

Division lineups
1995–1996
Iowa Barnstormers
St. Louis Stampede
Memphis Pharaohs
Milwaukee Mustangs
Creation of the Central Division as part of the American Conference. Iowa, St. Louis, and Memphis are enfranchised for this division.

1997
Iowa Barnstormers
Milwaukee Mustangs
Portland Forest Dragons
Texas Terror
Memphis moved to Portland as the Forest Dragons. St. Louis Stampede folded. Texas Terror moved in from National Conference's Southern Division.

1998–2000
Grand Rapids Rampage
Houston Thunderbears
Iowa Barnstormers
Milwaukee Mustangs
Grand Rapids Rampage enfranchised. Portland moved to American Conference's Western Division. Texas Terror renamed Houston Thunderbears.

2001
Chicago Rush
Detroit Fury
Grand Rapids Rampage
Indiana Firebirds
Milwaukee Mustangs
Albany from National Conference's Eastern Division moved into this division as Indiana Firebirds, relocated in Indianapolis. Chicago Rush and Detroit Fury enfranchised. Houston moved to Western Division. Iowa moved to Uniondale, New York as New York Dragons.

2002
Chicago Rush
Detroit Fury
Grand Rapids Rampage
Indiana Firebirds
Milwaukee Mustangs folded.

2003
Chicago Rush
Dallas Desperados
Grand Rapids Rampage
Indiana Firebirds
Dallas moved in from Western Division. Detroit Fury moved to Eastern Division.

2004
Chicago Rush
Colorado Crush
Detroit Fury
Grand Rapids Rampage
Indiana Firebirds
Colorado moved in from Western Division. Dallas moved to Eastern Division. Detroit moved back from Eastern Division.

2005–2006
Chicago Rush
Colorado Crush
Grand Rapids Rampage
Nashville Kats
Detroit and Indiana folded. Nashville Kats (not to be confused with Georgia Force of the Southern Division which are the original Kats team) enfranchised.

2007
Chicago Rush
Colorado Crush
Grand Rapids Rampage
Kansas City Brigade
Nashville Kats
Kansas City moved in from Southern Division.

2008
Chicago Rush
Colorado Crush
Grand Rapids Rampage
Kansas City Brigade
Nashville folded. Kansas City suspended. The AFL has been put on a one-year hiatus in 2009.

2010
Chicago Rush
Cleveland Gladiators
Iowa Barnstormers
Milwaukee Iron
Central Division moved to National Conference as Midwest Division. Cleveland moved in from Eastern Division (which is moved to the American Conference for this season as the Southwest Division). Milwaukee Iron as well as the second Iowa Barnstormers franchise (not to be confused with the original one known as the New York Dragons) moved in from the now-defunct AF2.

2011
Chicago Rush
Dallas Vigilantes
Iowa Barnstormers
Kansas City Command
Tulsa Talons
The Midwest Division changed its name back to Central Division. Dallas and Tulsa moved in from Southwest Division (now Eastern Division). Cleveland and Milwaukee moved to the Eastern Division. Kansas City reactivated.

2012
Chicago Rush
Iowa Barnstormers
Kansas City Command
San Antonio Talons
Dallas suspended, Tulsa relocated to San Antonio.

2013
Chicago Rush
Iowa Barnstormers
San Antonio Talons
Kansas City folded.

2014–2015
Portland Thunder
San Jose SaberCats
Spokane Shock
Central Division becomes Pacific Division. Portland enfranchised, Chicago folded, Iowa was moved to the East Division, and San Antonio was moved to the West Division.

After 2015, divisions were eliminated in favor of conferences due to declining team count.

Division Champions
 1995: St. Louis Stampede (9–3) 
 1996: Iowa Barnstormers (12–2)
 1997: Iowa Barnstormers (11–3)
 1998: Houston Thunderbears (8–6)
 1999: Iowa Barnstormers (11–3)
 2000: Iowa Barnstormers (9–5)
 2001: Grand Rapids Rampage (11–3)
 2002: Chicago Rush (9–5)
 2003: Dallas Desperados (10–6)
 2004: Chicago Rush (11–5)
 2005: Colorado Crush (10–6)
 2006: Colorado Crush (11–5)
 2007: Chicago Rush (12–4)
 2008: Chicago Rush (11–5)
 2010 (as Midwest Division): Milwaukee Iron (11–5)
 2011: Chicago Rush (13–5)
 2012: San Antonio Talons (14–4)
 2013: Chicago Rush (10–8)
 2014: San Jose SaberCats (13–5)
 2015: San Jose SaberCats (17–1)

References 

Arena Football League divisions
Chicago Rush
Iowa Barnstormers
San Antonio Talons
San Jose SaberCats
Spokane Shock
1995 establishments in the United States
St. Louis Stampede
Oklahoma Wranglers
Milwaukee Mustangs (1994–2001)
Grand Rapids Rampage
Houston Thunderbears
Detroit Fury
Indiana Firebirds
Dallas Desperados
Kansas City Command
Cleveland Gladiators
Milwaukee Mustangs (2009–2012)
Dallas Vigilantes
Portland Steel